Jean Petit (25 February 1914 – 25 May 1944) was a Belgian footballer. He was born in Liège, Belgium. He played as a defender for Standard de Liège. He played four times for Belgium in 1938.

Personal life and death
Petit retired from professional football early and became a medical doctor. He was killed during the Second World War in an Allied air raid in the Liege suburb of Kinkempois after attending a patient injured in an earlier raid.

Honours 
 Belgian international in 1938 (4 caps)
 Picked for the 1938 World Cup (did not play)
 Vice-Champion of Belgium in 1936 with Standard de Liège

References

External links

Belgium international footballers
Belgian footballers
Walloon sportspeople
1938 FIFA World Cup players
Standard Liège players
1914 births
1944 deaths
Footballers from Liège
Association football defenders
Belgian civilians killed in World War II
Deaths by airstrike during World War II